This article is a list of countries and territories by electricity generation from renewable sources every year. Note that most countries import and/or export electricity, so the percentage figure do not reflect the percentage of consumption that is renewable based.
Based on REN21's 2020 report, renewables contributed 19.2% to humans' global energy consumption and 23.7% to their generation of electricity in 2014 and 2015, respectively. This energy consumption is divided as 8.9% coming from traditional biomass, 4.2% as heat energy (modern biomass, geothermal and solar heat), 3.9% hydro electricity and 2.2% is electricity from wind, solar, geothermal, and biomass. 
Worldwide investments in renewable technologies amounted to more than US$332 billion in 2018. Globally, there are approximately 7.7 million jobs associated with the renewable energy industries, with solar photovoltaics being the largest renewable employer.  worldwide, more than half of all new electricity capacity installed was renewable.

The raw data is from IRENA unless a more recent source is available, and is augmented with US Energy Information Administration (EIA) statistics as specified.

* indicates "Renewable energy in COUNTRY or TERRITORY" links.

See also 

 List of countries by carbon dioxide emissions
 List of countries by carbon dioxide emissions per capita
 List of countries by electricity consumption
 List of countries by electricity production
 List of countries by energy intensity
 List of countries by greenhouse gas emissions
 List of countries by greenhouse gas emissions per person
 List of countries by total primary energy consumption and production
 Top contributors to greenhouse gas emissions

References

Lists related to renewable energy
Renewable electricity
Electricity production from renewable sources
Electricity production from renewable sources
Electric power-related lists